Livio Franceschini (born 14 April 1902, date of death unknown) was an Italian boxer who competed in the 1924 Summer Olympics. In 1924 he was eliminated in the second round of the featherweight class after losing his fight to Jean Devergnies.

References

External links
profile

1902 births
Year of death missing
Boxers from Rome
Featherweight boxers
Olympic boxers of Italy
Boxers at the 1924 Summer Olympics
Italian male boxers
20th-century Italian people